James Herbert Fay (April 29, 1899 – September 10, 1948) was an American lawyer and Democratic politician. He was a member of the United States House of Representatives from New York, serving two non-consecutive terms from 1939 to 1941, and from 1943 to 1945.

Biography 
Born in New York City, Fay was awarded a Purple Heart during his service in the military in World War I, where he lost one of his legs. He graduated from Brooklyn Law School in 1929.

Tenure in Congress 
In 1938, he was elected to Congress and served from January 3, 1939, to January 3, 1941. In 1940, Fay lost his bid for reelection to the Republican candidate, William T. Pheiffer. Fay defeated Pheiffer in 1942 by 80 votes and returned to his seat in Congress, serving from January 3, 1943, to January 3, 1945.

Death 
He died on September 10, 1948.

Sources

1899 births
1948 deaths
Brooklyn Law School alumni
Politicians from New York City
Burials at Long Island National Cemetery
Democratic Party members of the United States House of Representatives from New York (state)
20th-century American politicians
Lawyers from New York City
20th-century American lawyers